Jouret Bedran (also spelled Jurat Badran) is a village and municipality located in the Keserwan District of the  Keserwan-Jbeil Governorate in Lebanon. It has an average elevation of  1200 meters above sea level and a total land area of 120 hectares. 
Jouret Bedran's inhabitants are Maronites. The major surname in the village is Ghanem.

References

Populated places in Keserwan District
Maronite Christian communities in Lebanon